Grace Santiago is a fictional character on the American television series Nip/Tuck. She is the staff psychologist for McNamara/Troy. She was portrayed by Valerie Cruz.

Character history
  
Dr. Grace Santiago is first introduced into the show by meeting Sean for advice for two of his potential patients, identical twins who want to look different so as to express their own individuality. She gives Sean her expert advice as a psychologist that the twins need plastic surgery. After a brief misunderstanding between Sean and Grace, he hires Grace as staff psychologist to help make better judgments on potential patients.

Grace's first patient to work with at McNamara/Troy is a manic depressive, to whom she denies surgery; Grace claims that the patient is resisting drug therapy and is a bad candidate for the procedure. After the doctors deny the surgery, the patient commits suicide which gives Grace a poor start with the doctors.

Later, after noticing Christian's promiscuity, she refers him to Sexaholics Anonymous. Ironically, later in the same episode she has sex with Christian.

At one point during a consultation with Sean and a potential patient, Grace voices a suspicion that Sean is having an affair with the patient, Megan O'Hara. Though her accusations are true, Sean denies them, and they are never confirmed with Grace. Her accusation causes extreme friction in the McNamara/Troy office between Grace and the doctors.

Towards the end of Grace's stay at McNamara/Troy, she advises the doctors not to operate on a patient with multiple personality disorder. Once again Grace makes a bad diagnosis and there is a bad outcome for the doctors. Afterwards, Sean goes against Grace's advice and gives the operation.

Departure
Grace disappears from the series with no explanation. Four years after the character's departure, series creator Ryan Murphy explained that the character was removed because the show's writers felt it was unreasonable to have a psychiatrist in a plastic surgery clinic. He said, "Which kind of psychiatrist would recommend any patient a face lift instead of facing the real problem?"

At the beginning of the second season, Liz Winters is renamed Liz Cruz, a surname she retains for the rest of the series, as a tribute to Valerie Cruz.

References

Nip/Tuck characters
Fictional psychologists
Television characters introduced in 2003